Alexa Feser (born 30 December 1979), sometimes credited as Alexa Phazer is a German singer and songwriter. She is best known for taking part in Unser Song für Österreich.

Career
Feser was born in Wiesbaden and became interested in music at age four. She states that her grandfather, a jazz pianist is her biggest musical inspiration. She has worked as a backing singer for No Angels, Juliette Schoppmann, Joana Zimmer, Thomas Anders, Ricky Martin, and Mike Leon Grosch.

In January 2015, she was announced as one of the seven established artists taking part in Unser Song für Österreich. She competed with the songs "Glück" and "Das Gold von morgen". She passed round 1, after performing "Glück", but failed to qualify for round 3 with either of her songs.

Discography

Albums

Singles

As lead artist

As featured artist

References

1979 births
Living people
People from Wiesbaden
Feser, Alexa
21st-century German women singers
21st-century German women pianists
Warner Records artists